Richard Fust (fl. 1421) of Warnham and Chichester, Sussex, was an English politician.

He was a Member (MP) of the Parliament of England for Chichester in December 1421.

References

Year of birth missing
Year of death missing
English MPs December 1421
People from Chichester
People from Warnham